Deh-e Shaker (also Romanized as Deh-e Shāker; also known as Dam Shāţer, Deh-e Shāţer, Deh Shāţer, Dom-e Shāţer, Dom-e Shātīr, Dum-i-Shātir, and Dum Shātir) is a village in Almahdi Rural District, Jowkar District, Malayer County, Hamadan Province, Iran. At the 2006 census, its population was 520, in 132 families.

References 

Populated places in Malayer County